Yu County, also known by its Chinese name Yuxian, is a county in the east of Shanxi Province, China. It is under the administration of the prefecture-level city of Yangquan and occupies its northern majority.

Name
Yu County's name refers to its cup-like shape.

History
Yu County was settled by the Spring and Autumn Period, when it formed an independent kingdom.

Climate

Economy
It is best known for its production of black pepper and coal.

In 2005, the county's GDP was approximately 3.0 billion , with 600 million  in taxes. The GDP per capita was equal to 3,646 yuan income for farmers and the total retail sales of consumer goods has reached 970 million yuan. Furthermore, there is 100 million kg of crop output and 10.71 million tons of coal production.

Transportation
The county is served by Yangquan North railway station on the Shijiazhuang–Taiyuan high-speed railway.

Tourist attraction
  (藏山祠)

Geographical facts
Area: 
population: 
Distance from Taiyuan:

References

External links
Official Site

County-level divisions of Shanxi
Yangquan